Theatrical scenic painting includes wide-ranging disciplines, encompassing virtually the entire scope of painting and craft techniques. An experienced scenic painter (or scenic artist) will have skills in landscape painting, figurative painting, trompe-l'œil, and faux finishing, and be versatile in different media such as acrylic, oil, and tempera paint. The painter might also be accomplished in three-dimensional skills such as sculpting, plasterering and gilding. To select the optimal materials, scenic painters must also have knowledge of paint composition. 

The scenic painter takes direction from the theatre designer. In some cases designers paint their own designs.

The techniques and specialized knowledge of the scenic painter replicate an image to a larger scale from a designer's maquette, perhaps with accompanying photographs, printouts and original research, and sometimes with paint and style samples. Often, custom tools are made to create the desired effect.

Scenic paint 
Scenic paint has traditionally been mixed by the painter using pigment powder colour, a binder and a medium. The binder adheres the powder to itself and to the surface on which it is applied. The medium is a thinner which allows the paint to be worked more easily, disappearing as the paint dries. Today it is common to use brands of ready-made scenic paint, or pigment suspended in a medium to which a binder will be added.

References

Further reading
Crabtree, Susan; Beudert, Peter (2011), Scenic Art for the Theatre, Focal Press, 

Scenic design
Theatrical occupations
Visual arts genres